Declaration of Soria Moria may refer to:

The First Declaration of Soria Moria, crafted in 2005
The Second Declaration of Soria Moria, crafted in 2009